Roger Jenkins may refer to:

 Roger Jenkins (ice hockey) (1911–1994), ice hockey player
 Roger Jenkins (banker) (born 1955), formerly of Barclays Capital
 Roger Jenkins, business school dean, see Farmer School of Business
 Roger Jenkins (director) (1931–2022), British theatre and television director
 Roger Jenkins (boat racer) (1940–2021), British powerboat racer